Kim Ho-jung (born March 10, 1968) is a South Korean actress. Kim's portrayal as an ailing wife in Im Kwon-taek's film Revivre (2015), who is dying of cancer, won her the Best Supporting Actress at the 51st Baeksang Arts Awards.

Filmography

Film

Television series

Awards and nominations

References

External links 
 
 
 

1968 births
Living people
South Korean film actresses
South Korean stage actresses
South Korean television actresses
21st-century South Korean actresses
Best Supporting Actress Paeksang Arts Award (film) winners